The 1961 Davidson Wildcats football team represented Davidson College as a member of the Southern Conference (SoCon) during the 1961 NCAA University Division football season. Led by 10th-year head coach Bill Dole, the Wildcats compiled an overall record of 4–4 with a mark of 1–4 in conference play, placing eighth in the SoCon.

Schedule

References

Davidson
Davidson Wildcats football seasons
Davidson Wildcats football